William Troy may refer to:
William Troy (Medal of Honor) (1848–1907), US Navy Medal of Honor recipient
William F. Troy (1920–1967), American Jesuit, president of Wheeling Jesuit University
William Troy (abolitionist) (1827–1905), Baptist minister, writer, abolitionist
William Troy (educator) (1903–1961), American writer and teacher

See also
William Troy Herriage, baseball player